Kashubian Americans are Americans of Kashubian descent.

History 
The two earliest Kashubian American settlements in the United States were centered around Winona, Minnesota, and Portage County, Wisconsin. The Winona settlement included the Minnesota town of Pine Creek and the Wisconsin towns of Dodge, Fountain City, and Trempealeau. The Portage County settlement included the Wisconsin towns of Hull, Polonia, and Sharon. The Winona settlement is traditionally dated to 1855, but actually began in 1859. The Portage County settlement can be definitively traced back to 1858. Winona is dubbed the "Kashubian Capital of America" because of the large population of Kashubians there.

After the American Civil War and the German Kulturkampf from 1848-1884, Kashubians emigrated to the United States in three waves through the Kashubian region. While some headed for the Winona area and for Portage County, many Kashubians wound up living in major urban centers such as Buffalo, Detroit, Chicago, and Milwaukee. A smaller number of Kashubians settled in small farming communities scattered throughout Minnesota, North Dakota, and Montana. By the turn of the century, Kashubian Americans tended to identify themselves completely as Polish Americans, although in Winona at least the Kashubian language would survive for another generation or two.

Notable people

Paul Breza
Jan Romuald Byzewski
Jozef Cieminski
Hieronim Derdowski
Antoni Klawiter
Jakub W.J. Pacholski
Anne Pellowski
Paul Peter Rhode

See also

Kashubian Diaspora

Further reading
Amerykanie kaszubskiego pochodzenia : zagadnienia wybrane. Studia Pelplińskie, Tom 34 (2003) s. 163-247. Władysław Szulist
Turkowski, Jeffery. [Kashubians in Detroit.] [Rodziny], Polish Genealogical Society of America, Spring 2022. 19-26.
Radzilowski, John. The Eagle and The Cross: The History of the Polish Roman Catholic Union of America. (Columbia University Press, New York 2003)

References

 
 
 
Polish American